Don Ildefonso Díez de Rivera y Muro (24 January 1877, in Granada, Spain – 26 January 1846, in Valencia, Spain, 26 January 1846) was a Spanish noble and politician who served as Minister of State in 1836 and as President of the Senate.

He married, the 15 April 1815, Pascuala Ortiz de Almodóvar, 3rd Countess of Almodóvar.

|-
  

|-

Counts of Spain
Foreign ministers of Spain
1777 births
1846 deaths
Progressive Party (Spain) politicians
Members of the Senate of Spain
Presidents of the Senate of Spain